Kendel Shello (born November 24, 1973) is a former American football defensive end. He played for the Indianapolis Colts from 1996 to 1998.

References

1973 births
Living people
American football defensive ends
Southern Jaguars football players
Indianapolis Colts players